Sunohara (written: 春原) is a Japanese surname. Notable people with the surname include:

, Japanese film director
Vicky Sunohara (born 1970), Canadian ice hockey player

Fictional characters:
, a character in the visual novel Clannad
Ayaka (春原 彩花) and Nana Sunohara (春原 菜々), characters from the manga and anime series Miss Caretaker of Sunohara-sou

Japanese-language surnames